Quaid is a surname. Notable people with this surname include:

 Charles Quaid (1908–1984), New Zealand rugby union player
 Dennis Quaid (born 1954), American actor
 Evi Quaid (born 1963), American film director
 Jack Quaid (born 1992), American actor
 Joe Quaid (born 1972), Irish hurler
 Maeve Quaid, Canadian academic
 Nickie Quaid (born 1989), Irish hurler
 Randy Quaid (born 1950), American actor
 Seamus Quaid (1937–1980), Irish police officer
 Tommy Quaid (1957–1998), Irish hurler

Fictional characters 
 Douglas Quaid, main character in the films Total Recall (1990) and Total Recall (2012)

See also 
 McQuaid